The 1973 Grantland Rice Bowl was an NCAA Division II game following the 1973 season, between the Grambling Tigers (now the Grambling State Tigers) and the Western Kentucky Hilltoppers. This was the first year that the game served as a national semifinal for Division II – in prior years it had been the Mideast regional championship for the College Division. This was the last time that the game was played at BREC Memorial Stadium.

Notable participants
Western Kentucky defensive back Mike McCoy and running back Clarence Jackson were selected in the 1974 NFL Draft.  Defensive back Virgil Livers and defensive end John Bushong were selected in the 1975 NFL Draft. McCoy, Jackson, Livers, linebacker Rick Green, wide receiver Porter Williams, and head coach Jimmy Feix are inductees of the WKU Athletic Hall of Fame.

Grambling defensive end Charles Battle, defensive back Bill Bryant, defensive end Ezil Bibbs, and tight end Oliver Alexander were selected in the 1974 NFL Draft. Defensive tackle Gary Johnson, defensive end Bob Barber, and defensive end Jesse O'Neal were selected in the 1975 NFL Draft. Grambling players selected in the 1976 NFL Draft include cornerback James Hunter, wide receiver Sammy White, tight end Ron Singleton, and linebacker Robert Pennywell. Johnson, Hunter, White, and head coach Eddie Robinson are inductees of the Grambling Legends Sports Hall of Fame. Johnson and Robinson are inductees of the College Football Hall of Fame.

Scoring summary

References

Further reading
  (video)

Grantland Rice Bowl
Grantland Rice Bowl
Grambling State Tigers football bowl games
Western Kentucky Hilltoppers football bowl games
Grantland Rice Bowl
Grantland Rice